Metro Retail Stores Group Inc. (stylized as METRO Retail Stores Group Inc., shortly known as Metro Retail or Metro) is a retail company based in Mandaue, Philippines.

According to a 2014 report by Euromonitor, Metro is the largest operator of department stores and hypermarkets in the Visayas region, as well as the second largest supermarket operator according to retail sales value.

History
In the 1970s, Modesta Gaisano established White Gold Department Store in Cebu City. After her death in 1981, her five sons - David, Stephen, Henry, Victor, and John, pursued their respective business interests by operating their respective retail operations.

Victor Gaisano and his wife, Sally, founded the Metro Retail Stores Group in 1982 with the establishment of the Metro Gaisano Department Store and Supermarket. The group expanded to major cities outside Cebu by opening stores in key cities in Central, Western, and Eastern Visayas, as well as in Central Luzon, Metro Manila and South Luzon.

The company's expansion in Metro Manila, in particular, was marked by the opening of the Market! Market! mall in the early 2000s.

Metro Retail Stores Group made its debut at the Philippine Stock Exchange on November 25, 2015.

Ancillary businesses

References

External links
 Metro Retail Stores Group Inc website
  Metro Department Store Microsite
 Metro Supermarket Microsite
 Super Metro Microsite

Retail companies of the Philippines
Companies based in Mandaue
Supermarkets of the Philippines
Department stores of the Philippines
Retail companies established in 1982
Companies listed on the Philippine Stock Exchange
Philippine companies established in 1982